The Quezon Memorial Shrine is a monument and national shrine dedicated to former Philippine President Manuel Quezon located within the grounds of Quezon Memorial Circle in Quezon City, Metro Manila. It also houses a museum at its base.

History
The Quezon Memorial Committee which was tasked to organize a nationwide fund-raising campaign for the building of a monument dedicated to former President Manuel Quezon was established by virtue of Executive Order No. 79 signed by then-President Sergio Osmeña on December 17, 1945. Then-President Elpidio Quirino proposed the relocation of the monument away from its original planned site but such plans were not pushed through. The Bureau of Public Works commenced the construction of the monument in 1952.

The monument was placed under the jurisdiction of the National Historical Institute through Presidential Decree No.1 issued by then President Ferdinand Marcos on September 24, 1972.

On January 14, 1974, the monument was formally designated as a national shrine and was inaugurated on August 19, 1978. The remains of former President Manuel Quezon was transferred to the Quezon Memorial Shrine from the Manila North Cemetery on August 1, 1979. The remains of his wife Aurora Aragon Quezon, were likewise transferred to the shrine on April 28, 2005. On March 12, 2020, the shrine was recognized by the National Historical Commission of the Philippines as a National Cultural Treasure (NCT) but such declaration was only made public in December 2021.

Architecture and design
The Quezon Memorial Shrine was designed by Federico Ilustre. The  monument is composed of three connected pylons and is located at the center of the Quezon Memorial Circle, a major park in Quezon City. An observation deck is also present at the top of the structure which has a capacity of 60 people which can provide a panoramic view of the city. A spiral staircase connects the deck to the bottom of the structure. The observation deck is currently not open to the public.

The columns are adorned with three grieving bowed angels holding sampaguita (Jasminum sambac) wreaths with each of them representing the three major island groups of the Philippines namely, Luzon, Visayas and Mindanao. Each of the angels were given a traditional clothing representing one of the three island group. The angel figures were made by Italian sculptor Francesco Riccardo Monti.

Under the watch of former Quezon City Mayor Tomas Morato, the monument was beautified by Amberti, an Italian architect hired by Morato, with Carrara marble. Morato's successors replaced the Italian marbles with locally sourced marble.

Museum

At the base of the Quezon Memorial Shrine is the Museo ni Manuel L. Quezon, a museum that has a collection of relics and memorabilia related to former President Manuel Quezon, as well as a mausoleum which houses the interred remains of Quezon and his wife Aurora Aragon Quezon. The museum underwent a renovation by the National Historical Commission of the Philippines and was reopened on August 19, 2015.

Among the other features of the museum is a hologram of Quezon delivering his inaugural speech as president and interactive booths and terminals which edifies visitors regarding the Commonwealth era. The museum also has an audio-visual room where a short documentary on Quezon and the museum is screened, a dedicated gallery to Quezon's wife, Aurora, and a replica of Manuel Quezon's presidential office.

References

External links

Shrine
Tourist attractions in Quezon City
Art Deco sculptures and memorials
Cultural Properties of the Philippines in Metro Manila
Art Deco architecture in the Philippines
Monuments and memorials in Metro Manila
Buildings and structures in Quezon City
Museums in Quezon City
History museums in the Philippines
City museums in the Philippines
National Cultural Treasures of the Philippines